95th Street–Beverly Hills is one of five Metra stations within the Beverly Hills neighborhood of Chicago, Illinois, along the Beverly Branch of the Rock Island District Line. The station is on 95th Street (US 12-20),  from LaSalle Street Station, the northern terminus of the line. In Metra's zone-based fare system, 95th Street is in zone C. As of 2018, 95th Street–Beverly Hills is the 108th busiest of Metra's 236 non-downtown stations, with an average of 443 weekday boardings.

As of 2022, 95th Street–Beverly Hills is served by 20 trains in each direction on weekdays, by 10 inbound trains and 11 outbound trains on Saturdays, and by eight trains in each direction on Sundays.

Parking is available on the south side of 95th Street between the railroad tracks and Longwood Drive, and further west on the corner of 95th Street and Pleasant Avenue.

Bus connections
CTA
 95 95th 

Pace
 381 95th Street 
 395 95th/Dan Ryan CTA/UPS Hodgkins (Weekday UPS shifts only)

References

External links

Image of Beverly Hills - 95th Street Station (Metra Rail Photos)
Station from 95th Street from Google Maps Street View

Metra stations in Chicago
Former Chicago, Rock Island and Pacific Railroad stations
Railway stations in the United States opened in 1945